Marjorie Flora Fraser, 21st Lady Saltoun (born 18 October 1930) is a Scottish peer. Until her retirement on 12 December 2014, she was the only holder of a lordship of Parliament who had a seat in the House of Lords as an elected hereditary peer. Lady Saltoun is the Chief of the Name and Arms of Clan Fraser since 1 May 1984, by decree of the Court of the Lord Lyon. She is also the head of the Scottish lowland family the Frasers of Philorth.

Biography 
Flora Fraser was born in Edinburgh, Scotland, as the daughter of Alexander Fraser and Dorothy Geraldine Welby. Her maternal grandfather was Charles Glynne Earle Welby, 5th Baronet. She had an elder brother, Alexander Simon Fraser, Master of Saltoun. In 1933, her father became the 20th Lord Saltoun and she was styled the Hon. Flora Fraser. Her brother received the Military Cross and was killed in action in March 1944 while serving with the Grenadier Guards, making Flora heir presumptive to the Lordship.

In 1979, when Lord Saltoun died, Flora became the 21st Lady Saltoun, and also gained a seat in the House of Lords. In 1999, because of the House of Lords Act 1999, 662 hereditary peers were removed from the House. However, Lady Saltoun was one of the ninety hereditary peers who were elected to remain in the House.

On 6 October 1956 at Fraserburgh, Aberdeenshire, Lady Saltoun married Alexander Ramsay of Mar (1919–2000), a grandson of Prince Arthur, Duke of Connaught and Strathearn, keeping her maiden surname after marriage.

The couple have three daughters:
Katharine Fraser, Mistress of Saltoun (born 11 October 1957), the heir presumptive to her mother's peerage and the leadership of the Clan Fraser. Married Mark Nicolson on 3 May 1980 and had issue.
 The Hon. Alice Elizabeth Margaret Ramsay of Mar (born 8 July 1961) married David Ramsey on 28 July 1990 and had issue.
 The Hon. Elizabeth Alexandra Mary Ramsay of Mar (born 15 April 1963), the youngest great-great-grandchild of Queen Victoria.

Footnotes

References

External links
Lady Saltoun's website

1930 births
Clan Fraser
Living people
Hereditary women peers
People educated at Heathfield School, Ascot
Politicians from Edinburgh
Lords Saltoun
Hereditary peers elected under the House of Lords Act 1999